Gangsters is a British television programme made by BBC television drama and shown in two series from 1976 to 1978. It was created by Philip Martin and starred Maurice Colbourne as John Kline, a former SAS officer recruited by law enforcement to become an undercover agent in Birmingham.

Production 
Produced at the BBC's Pebble Mill Studios in Birmingham by David Rose, Gangsters began its television life as an edition of Play for Today in 1975, followed by two series transmitted in 1976 and 1978. The series, set in the multi-cultural criminal community of Birmingham, has remained a cult favourite, memorable for its strong violence, multi-ethnic cast (and realistic – and now rather shocking – depiction of the racism of the time) and highly stylised, post-modern approach to storytelling.

Gangsters featured references to film noir, gangster films, westerns, Bollywood and kung fu movies, as well as increasingly surreal end-of-episode cliffhangers and a bizarre final scene where the characters not only "break the fourth wall" but walk off the set.

The two series had quite different tones. The first was a gritty thriller whilst the second was more surreal, with more emphasis on the post-modern elements although it wasn't well received at the time.

The theme music was an instrumental composed and performed by Dave Greenslade. It was released as a single with a character theme from the series, "Rubber Face, Lonely Eyes", on the B-side; the single was credited to Dave Greenslade's band Greenslade, even though the only performers on both tracks are Dave Greenslade and a session drummer. Greenslade recorded their own version of the song for their album Time and Tide. At David Rose's request, for the last series Dave Greenslade adapted it into a version with lyrics sung by Chris Farlowe.

Cast
 John Kline (Maurice Colbourne) – a tough, shady former SAS soldier recently released from prison who becomes embroiled in the intrigues of the local underworld while attempting to go straight.
 Khan (Ahmed Khalil) – police detective who uses Kline as a pawn in his bid to nail the organised crime syndicates of Birmingham.
 Anne Darracott (Elizabeth Cassidy) – a young woman and former heroin addict who becomes Kline's live-in lover.
 Aslam Rafiq (Saeed Jaffrey) – the charismatic boss of a racket trafficking illegal immigrants.
 Sarah Gant (Alibe Parsons) – glamorous undercover CIA agent out to nail the drugs trade in the city, with a private mission to avenge the murder of her sister.
 Kuldip (Paul Satvendar) – Rafiq's murderous henchman.
 Malleson (Paul Barber) – a former thug who takes over his boss’s underworld empire after he is killed and proves to be a formidable adversary of Kline and Khan.
 Shen Tang (Robert Lee) – the leader of a local Chinese triad gang.
 Lily Li Tang (Chai Lee) – the daughter of Shen Tang, who assists her father in the running of the triad.
 Rolf Day (Rolf Day) – The racist night club comedian who performs in the Rum Runner night club.
 The series's writer, Philip Martin, also appeared in multiple roles, playing the gangland boss Rawlinson in the original play, the hired assassin 'The White Devil' at the end of season two (though Martin was credited as Larson E Whipsnide, a reference to his WC Fields inspired performance as the character), and as himself, dictating the script to a typist, in cutaways throughout season two.

DVD release
The complete series of Gangsters was released on DVD (Region 2, UK) through 2 Entertain/Cinema Club in April 2006.

References

External links
 
 Action TV
 Newton's Laws Of Television: Gangsters
 British Film Institute Screen Online
 Gangsters article at The Anorak Zone

1975 British television series debuts
1978 British television series endings
1970s British drama television series
BBC television dramas
1970s British crime television series
Television shows set in Birmingham, West Midlands
Play for Today
English-language television shows